Qaduneh-ye Sofla (also Romanized as Qadūneh-ye Soflá; also known as Qūdāneh-ye Pā’īn) is a village in Zavkuh Rural District, Pishkamar District, Kalaleh County, Golestan Province, Iran. At the 2006 census, its population was 717, in 125 families.

References 

Populated places in Kalaleh County